The 2011 FIA WTCC Race of Brazil was the opening round of the 2011 World Touring Car Championship season and the sixth running of the FIA WTCC Race of Brazil. It was held at the Autódromo Internacional de Curitiba near Curitiba, Brazil on 20 March 2011. This was the first race for the new FIA 1.6T world engine formula.

Both races were won by Chevrolet RML with Robert Huff winning race one and Alain Menu winning race two.

Background
The Brazilian round had originally been scheduled to be held at the Autódromo José Carlos Pace in São Paulo but reverted to Curitiba in February owing to renovation works being carried out at the Interlagos circuit.

BMW had officially withdrawn its works commitment from the World Touring Car Championship at the end of the 2011. The German manufacturer instead focused on a customer programme with the new turbocharged engine. Volvo joined the series, entering a single car for Robert Dahlgren for the full season having only previously made one–off appearances in the championship.

Former SEAT León Eurocup racer Pepe Oriola joined the WTCC with SUNRED Engineering, becoming the youngest driver to compete in the series at the age of 16.

Report

Testing and free practice
Tiago Monteiro of SUNRED Engineering was quickest in the opening shakedown session on Friday morning, less than a tenth quicker than the Chevrolet of Menu. Gabriele Tarquini and Javier Villa didn't set any times as their cars were being worked on and while the session had been scheduled to run for 90 minutes, it was cut short by 20 minutes after a heavy crash for Tarquini's Lukoil–SUNRED team–mate Aleksei Dudukalo.

Tom Coronel topped the opening test session on his first outing for returning team ROAL Motorsport. Huff was the leading Chevrolet driver and SEAT Swiss Racing by SUNRED Fredy Barth was the leading SEAT in fourth. Local driver Cacá Bueno driving a factory Chevrolet was sixth and the Volvo C30 of Dahlren was ninth.

The first free practice session on Saturday morning took place in wet conditions with Huff going fastest. Villa got out for his first laps in the BMW 320 TC having missed both sessions on Friday.

It was a Chevrolet 1–2–3–4 in free practice two with defending champion Yvan Muller leading Huff, Bueno and Menu. Oriola had a near–miss when his SUNRED car went through one of the gravel traps, while technical problems stopped Marchy Lee at the pit exit in his DeTeam KK Motorsport BMW 320 TC.

Qualifying
Huff took pole position in the new look qualifying format. The race one grid would be decided by the times from Q2, while the race two grid would be decided by the times from Q1 with the top ten reversed. Alain Menu failed to get through to Q2 to start eleventh for both races. The Volvo of Dahlgren lined up behind him. Huff had been close to dropping out but ended the session with the fifth fastest time.

Huff set the fastest time near the beginning of the ten minute Q2 session, rain set in towards the end of the session and nobody was able to beat his time. Muller lined up alongside him on the front row for race one. Bueno behind them made it a Chevrolet 1–2–3 and Michel Nykjær ended up fourth as the best independent driver. Kristian Poulsen was next up in fifth with Tarquini, Monteiro, Coronel, Barth and Franz Engstler completing the top ten.

Warm-Up
Muller was the fastest driver in the Sunday morning session with Barth second and pole sitter Huff third.

Race One
Huff started from pole position and led the entire race to claim the first win for the new turbocharged Chevrolet Cruze, holding back Muller all the way. Bueno had been challenged by Poulsen at turn one but the Danish driver could not pull off the move and then came under threat from Coronel. A mistake exiting Esse da Baixa allowed Coronel to pass and take fourth place. Poulsen closed in on Coronel and the two battled side–by–side, the Danish driver reclaimed fourth for a brief time before Coronel claimed the place on the last lap. Menu had taken advantage of the battle between Tarquini and Nykjær and passed both them to finish sixth. At the end of the race, Chevrolet finished 1–2–3 with Huff leading Muller and Bueno who took his first WTCC podium and points finish on home turf. Coronel, Poulsen and Menu came next and Tarquini, Nykjær, Engstler and Mehdi Bennani completed the top ten.

Race Two
After Barth was stripped of his best Q1 time, Menu moved up to pole position for the second race. At the start, Menu made a slow start and Coronel took the lead of the race having started from third, while Tarquini moved up to second. On lap three, Menu got past Tarquini to take second place with the rest of the Chevrolets close behind passing the SEAT on the following lap. Poulsen and Nykjær were fighting over the lead of Yokohama Trophy on lap six when the pair collided, Nykjær retired while dropped down the order. Menu had caught Coronel on lap ten and made a move for the lead at turn one. The pair touched and Coronel went off the track but stayed second, while Huff and Muller made contact fighting over the final podium spot with Muller getting the advantage. At the end of the race, Menu won with Coronel second and Muller third. Villa was the independents' winner by finishing eighth and Oriola scored a point in his first weekend finishing tenth.

Results

Qualifying

 — Barth missed the weigh bridge after qualifying and had his times from Q1 removed.

 — O'Young was excluded from qualifying after his bamboo-engineering team worked on his car under parc ferme conditions.

Race 1

Bold denotes Fastest lap.

Race 2

Bold denotes Fastest lap.

Standings after the event

Drivers' Championship standings

Yokohama Independents' Trophy standings

Manufacturers' Championship standings

 Note: Only the top five positions are included for both sets of drivers' standings.

References

Results Booklet PDF at MST Systems

External links
World Touring Car Championship official website

Brazil
FIA WTCC Race of Brazil
FIA WTCC Race of Brazil